The Pacific Institute for Studies in Development, Environment, and Security is an American non-profit research institute created in 1987 to provide independent research and policy analysis on issues of development, environment, and security, with a particular focus on global and regional freshwater issues. It is located in Oakland, California.

The institute's primary focus is on water conservation and demand management. The mission of the institute is to "[create] and [advance] solutions to the world’s most pressing water challenges".

History and research
Institute staff analyze science and policy to provide workshops and briefings for communities involved in issues surrounding water, climate, energy, environmental security, and globalization, with a focus on hydrologic sciences, water management, and water policy. Institute researchers in 2014 warned that the lack of replenishment water in the Salton Sea was leading to a "period of very rapid deterioration." With the increased shrinkage, dust storms would increase and a rotten-egg smell could reach to the coastal cities. A known publication from the institute is The World's Water: The Biennial Report on Freshwater Resources. In 2012 the Institute produced a new book A 21st Century U.S. Water Policy.

Peter Gleick co-founded the institute in 1987 and directed it until mid-2016. Gleick is president emeritus, having been succeeded as president by Jason Morrison.

References

External links
 

Sustainability organizations
Sustainability in the United States
Water and the environment
Research institutes in California
Research institutes in the San Francisco Bay Area
Political and economic think tanks in the United States
Environmental organizations based in California
Organizations based in Oakland, California
Environmental research institutes
Non-profit organizations based in California
Organizations established in 1987
501(c)(3) organizations